Pan is an 1894 novel by Norwegian author Knut Hamsun. He wrote it while living in Paris and in Kristiansand, Norway. It remains one of his most famous works.

Plot summary
Lieutenant Thomas Glahn, a hunter and ex-military man, lives alone in a hut in the forest with his faithful dog Aesop.  Upon meeting Edvarda, the daughter of a merchant in a nearby town, they are both strongly attracted to each other, but neither understands the other's love. Overwhelmed by the society of people where Edvarda lives, Glahn has a series of tragedies befall him before he leaves forever.

Symbolism
The changing seasons are reflected in the plot: Edvarda and Glahn fall in love in spring; make love in the summer; and end their relationship in the autumn.

The contradicting symbols of culture and nature are important in the novel: Glahn belongs to nature, while Edvarda belongs to culture.

Much of what happens between Glahn and Edvarda is foreshadowed when Glahn dreams of two lovers. The lovers' conversations also foretell the future.

Epilogue
The Epilogue: Glahn's Death is told from another person's perspective. In the main narrative of the book, which is told in first person by Glahn, he sees himself as awkward and unattractive. The Epilogue shows that is not the case, instead from an outsider's viewpoint Glahn is beautiful, talented and desired. Glahn has left Nordland and moved to India to be alone in the forest and to hunt, but he is suicidal because of his lost love, and when he can not bear it any longer he provokes the narrator of the Epilogue into shooting him.

Film adaptations
The novel has been adapted for film four times. The first was a Norwegian silent film directed by Harald Schwenzen in 1922. In 1937, a German-made version was produced under the sponsorship of Nazi propaganda minister Joseph Goebbels, who considered Hamsun one of his favorite authors. Goebbels had initially attempted to get Greta Garbo for this film, but was unsuccessful, and he did not like the finished film, which became the first foreign film to be released in Norway with its soundtrack dubbed into Norwegian. The next version, a color production by the Swedish studio Sandrews, was directed by Bjarne Henning-Jensen and released in 1962 under the title Kort är sommaren (Summer is short).  A Danish/Norwegian/German version, directed by Danish director Henning Carlsen, was released in 1995. The book is also the basis of Guy Maddin's 1997 Canadian film Twilight of the Ice Nymphs and the primary inspiration for Ben Rivers' 2011 docufiction Two Years at Sea.

References

External links
Romantikken vs Nyromantikken (Norwegian)
Pan (Norwegian)
 

1894 Norwegian novels
Novels by Knut Hamsun
Modernist novels
Psychological novels
Norwegian novels adapted into films